Ben Ashkenazy (born 1968/69) is an American billionaire real estate developer. He is the founder, CEO, and majority owner of Ashkenazy Acquisition Corporation, which has a $12 billion property portfolio.

Early life
Ashkenazy was born in Israel, and grew up in Lawrence, Long Island, New York, the son of Izzy Ashkenazy, also a real estate businessman.

Career
Ashkenazy bought his first property at the age of 18. He attended night classes at Adelphi University, but did not graduate.

In 1987, he founded Ashkenazy Acquisition Corporation.

In 2013, his company bought London's Old Spitalfields Market, but later sold it. In July 2017, the company bought London's Grosvenor House Hotel for about $750 million.

His company holds a long-term lease agreement with the City of Boston for Boston's Faneuil Hall Marketplace, leases Washington DC's Union Station, and has a $70 million stake in New York's Plaza Hotel.

In November 2019, his company purchased the 83,923-square-foot Ferndale Shopping Center in Larchmont for a price exceeding $35 million.

Personal life
He is married to Debra Ashkenazy, they have three children, and live on New York City's Fifth Avenue.

He hired rapper Drake to perform at his daughter's bat mitzvah in the Rainbow Room.

Ashkenazy is a minority owner of Euroleague Basketball club Maccabi Tel Aviv B.C.

References

Living people
1960s births
American billionaires
American company founders
People from Lawrence, Nassau County, New York
American real estate businesspeople
20th-century American Jews
American people of Israeli descent
21st-century American Jews